"Parlez-vous français ?" ("Do you speak French?") is a song recorded by Spanish disco duo Baccara, written by Rolf Soja, Frank Dostal and Peter Zentner. It is best known as the  entry at the Eurovision Song Contest 1978, held in Paris.

Background
The French-language version of "Parlez-vous français?" was included on Baccara's second studio album Light My Fire and an English version – with the same title – was also released as a single in certain markets.

The song was composed and produced by the same team who had written the duo's breakthrough single "Yes Sir, I Can Boogie" and the follow-ups "Sorry, I'm a Lady" and "Darling", the Germans Rolf Soja and Frank Dostal, with Peter Zentner(also lyrics).

The song is an up-tempo disco duet, with the singers describing the importance of speaking French – described as "the language of love and summer". One of them at least has recently been on holiday and required a working knowledge of that language in order to have a holiday romance.

Eurovision
The song was performed seventeenth on the night, following 's Mabel with "Boom Boom" and preceding 's Izhar Cohen and Alphabeta with "A-Ba-Ni-Bi". At the close of voting, it had received 73 points, placing 7th in a field of 20.

Despite its moderate success in the Contest "Parlez-vous français?" proved to be one of the year's best-selling entries, reaching #8 in Sweden, #18 in Austria, #21 in West Germany and #30 on the Dutch singles charts. However, when the duo released their first 'greatest hits' album in late 1978, The Hits of Baccara, the song was surprisingly omitted. Despite this, "Parlez-vous français?" has become a favourite among Contest fans, most recently being performed as part of a medley by Dana International during the Congratulations special in late 2005.

It was succeeded as Luxembourgish representative at the 1979 contest by Jeane Manson with "J'ai déjà vu ça dans tes yeux". Composers Rolf Soja and Frank Dostal returned to the Contest in  when they co-wrote Luxembourg's entry "L'amour de ma vie", performed by Canadian singer Sherisse Laurence.

Charts

External links
 Official Eurovision Song Contest site, history by year, 1978
 Detailed info & lyrics, The Diggiloo Thrush, "Parlez-vous français?"

References

Eurovision songs of Luxembourg
Female vocal duets
Songs written by Frank Dostal
Eurovision songs of 1978
1978 songs
RCA Records singles
1978 singles